Eric Conerty (born January 21, 2000) is an American professional soccer player who currently plays as a midfielder for Forward Madison in USL League One.

Career

Youth
Conerty played his freshman season of high school for Forest Hills Central High School before joining the Columbus Crew Academy for two years. He returned to Forest Hills Central for his senior season, when he was named a First Team All-American by the United Soccer Coaches after tallying 40 goals and 12 assists.

College
Conerty played his freshman season of college soccer at Butler University, playing 17 games and tallying two goals and two assists, before transferring to Western Michigan University. At Western Michigan, Conerty had 11 goals and 16 assists in four seasons and was named Academic-All MAC each year. He was selected to the All-MAC First Team in 2022.

Professional
On February 7, 2023, Conerty signed his first professional contract with Forward Madison FC of USL League One.

References

2000 births
Living people
American soccer players
Association football midfielders
Butler Bulldogs men's soccer players
Western Michigan Broncos men's soccer players
Forward Madison FC players
USL League One players
USL League Two players
Soccer players from Michigan
Sportspeople from Grand Rapids, Michigan